Archbishop Tenison's Church of England High School, commonly known as Tenison's, is a co-educational 11-18, voluntary aided, school in the London Borough of Croydon, England, part of the educational provision of the Anglican Diocese of Southwark and Croydon Council. It is a specialist Mathematics and Computing College.

History 
Several schools were founded by Thomas Tenison, an educational philanthropist, in the late 17th and early 18th centuries. In 1714, Tenison, by then Archbishop of Canterbury, founded a school for some “ten poor boys and ten poor girls” on a site which is now close to Croydon’s shopping centre. Just over 300 years and three sites later, it is thought that the School is the oldest surviving mixed-sex school in the world.

Due to the hostilities of the Second World War, the School was moved away from the dangers of the Blitz in South London and relocated to Craigmore Hall in the countryside near Crowborough, East Sussex, with pupils evacuated and billeted with the local populace. After the War, the School returned to Croydon and Craigmore Hall returned to private use.

The School now occupies a site established almost 50 years ago in a leafy residential area of Croydon – Park Hill, ten minutes' walk from East Croydon station. It caters for around 800 pupils, of whom approximately 270 are in the Sixth Form. Since 1959, the facilities have been augmented by the building of a Sixth Form Centre, an Art block, and Geography and Technology Centres.

In its Ofsted report, from February 2008, the Lower School and Sixth Form were both described as being "Outstanding", receiving the highest inspection grades available.

Founder’s Day 
A Tenisonian tradition is that once a year, usually the morning of the first Friday in May, the entire school gathers to celebrate the anniversary of its foundation in 1714, the life of the founder Thomas Tenison and the achievements of the past academic year. The event is attended by pupils, the governors and representatives from the Diocese of Southwark.

The annual report is read by the headmaster and a short speech is given. After the service pupils do not have to return to lessons.

School armorials 

The badges of both the surviving schools founded by Thomas Tenison are based on his personal coat of arms, which consist of the arms of the see of Canterbury impaled with the Tenison family arms. The former, placed on the dexter side of honour, are blazoned as: Azure, an archiepiscopal cross in pale or surmounted by a pall proper charged with four crosses patee fitchee sable.  The arms of Tenison, placed on the sinister side of the escutcheon are blazoned as: Gules, a bend engrailed argent voided azure, between three leopard's faces or jessant-de-lys azure.

In standard English: a red field bearing a white (or silver) diagonal band with scalloped edges, and a narrower blue band running down its centre. This lies between three gold heraldic lion's faces, each of which is pierced by a fleur-de-lys entering through the mouth.

Origin

These arms are a difference, or variant, of the mediaeval arms of the family of Denys of Siston, Gloucestershire, and may have been adopted by the Tenison family because its name signifies "Denys's or Denis's son". The arms were originally those of the Norman de Cantilupe family, whose feudal tenants the Denys family probably were in connection with Candleston Castle in Glamorgan. St Thomas Cantilupe(d.1282), bishop of Hereford, gave a reversed (i.e. upside down) version of the Cantilupe arms to the see of Hereford, which uses them to this day. A version of the Denys arms was also adopted by the family of the poet laureate Alfred, Lord Tennyson, not known to have been a descendant of Archbishop Thomas Tenison.

Houses 
Pupils at Tenison's are organised in a manner typical of British schools - they are sorted into a house system. These houses determine the colour of a pupil's mitres on their school tie. Pupils are actively a part of the house system from years 7 to 10, and compete annually for the House Points Cup and the Inter-House Cup (a sporting competition). Involvement within the house system lessens in year 11; however, there have been calls to put greater emphasis on the house system, and inter-house competitions, for all year groups.

The houses at Tenison's are named after famous Archbishops of Canterbury, and include:
Fisher
Ramsey
Temple
Becket
Wood

Sport 
The school has no on-site grass playing fields but has the use of nearby Lloyd Park and facilities at nearby Coombe Lodge, providing pitches for both football and cricket. In 2002 the school opened an all-weather surface on the School site which enables the provision of tennis, basketball, netball and five-a-side football, as well as four other on-site tennis courts. The school also has a sports hall

Sixth form 
The sixth form was established jointly with St Andrew's High School, Croydon in 1978 but resides on Tenison's premises.

Old Tenisonians 

Notable Old Tenisonians include: 
Joshua Buatsi, Olympic boxing medallist 
Graham Butcher, first-class cricketer
Mark Butcher, Test cricketer
Lynne Owens, Director General of the National Crime Agency

See also
 Archbishop Tenison's School in Lambeth

References

External links
Archbishop Tenison's School

Secondary schools in the London Borough of Croydon
Educational institutions established in 1714
1714 establishments in England

Church of England secondary schools in the Diocese of Southwark
Voluntary aided schools in London